Lativalva is a genus of moths of the family Crambidae.

Species
Lativalva monotona Amsel, 1956
Lativalva pseudosmithii Amsel, 1956

References

Glaphyriinae
Crambidae genera
Taxa named by Hans Georg Amsel